Rizehvand is a village in Ilam Province, Iran.

Rizehvand may also refer to:
 Rizehvand, Kermanshah
 Rizehvand-e Ali Akbar, Kermanshah Province
 Rizehvand-e Najaf, Kermanshah Province

See also
 Rizvand (disambiguation)